Dybo or DYBO may refer to:

Dybo (surname)
Emperor Dybo, a fictional character from the Quintaglio Ascension Trilogy
DYBO, the callsign of a station owned by Brigada Mass Media Corporation